Dany Ryser (born 25 April 1957) is a Swiss football manager.  He is currently in charge  of the Switzerland national under-17 football team. In 2009, he led the under-17 side in winning the 2009 FIFA U-17 World Cup. The following year he won the award for Swiss football coach of the year.

Ryser has since 1 November 1986 been a UEFA Pro-License coach. Since 1997 he has worked for Swiss Football Association. He previously coached FC Biel-Bienne and several Switzerland national football teams at various age-levels.

Honours
Switzerland
 FIFA U-17 World Cup winner: 2009

References

External links
 Swiss Football Federation profile

1957 births
Living people
Swiss football managers
FC Biel-Bienne managers
People from Solothurn
Sportspeople from the canton of Solothurn